Solomon Tshekisho Plaatje (9 October 1876 – 19 June 1932) was a South African intellectual, journalist, linguist, politician, translator and writer. Plaatje was a founding member and first General Secretary of the South African Native National Congress (SANNC), which became the African National Congress (ANC). The Sol Plaatje Local Municipality, which includes the city of Kimberley, is named after him, as is the Sol Plaatje University in that city, which opened its doors in 2014.

Early life 

Plaatje was born in Doornfontein  near Boshof, Orange Free State (now Free State Province, South Africa), the sixth of eight sons. His grandfather's name was Selogilwe Mogodi (1836-1881) but his employer, the Boer farmer Groenewald, nicknamed him Plaatje ('Picture') in 1856 and the family started using this as a surname. His parents Johannes and Martha were members of the Tswana nation. They were Christians and worked for missionaries at mission stations in South Africa. When Solomon was four, the family moved to Pniel near Kimberley in the Cape Colony to work for a German missionary, Ernst Westphal (the grandfather of the linguist Ernst Westphal) and his wife Wilhelmine. There he received a mission-education. When he outpaced fellow learners he was given additional private tuition by Mrs. Westphal, who also taught him to play the piano and violin and gave him singing lessons. In February 1892, aged 15, he became a pupil-teacher, a post he held for two years.

After leaving school, he moved to Kimberley in 1894 where he became a telegraph messenger for the Post Office. He subsequently passed the clerical examination (the highest in the colony) with higher marks than any other candidate in Dutch and typing (reported by Neil Parsons in his foreword to Native Life in South Africa, Before and Since the European War and the Boer Rebellion). At that time, the Cape Colony had qualified franchise for all men 21 or over, the qualification being that they be able to read and write English or Dutch and earn over 50 pounds a year. Thus, when he turned 21 in 1897, he was able to vote, a right he would later lose when the Cape Colony was merged with other Southern African colonies into the Union of South Africa.

Shortly thereafter, he became a court interpreter for the British colonial authorities in Mafeking when the settlement was under siege and kept a diary of his experiences which were published posthumously.

After the Second Boer War ended, he was optimistic that the British government would ensure that all males in South Africa would continue to be granted qualified franchise, but they instead handed over the majority of political power to the new South African government, which restricted voting rights to white South Africans only. Plaatje criticised the British government for this decision in an unpublished 1909 manuscript entitled Sekgoma – the Black Dreyfus.

Career 

As an activist and politician, he spent much of his life in the struggle for the enfranchisement and liberation of African people. He was a founder member and first General Secretary of the South African Native National Congress (SANNC), which became the African National Congress (ANC) ten years later in 1922. As a member of an SANNC deputation, he traveled to England to protest against the Natives Land Act, 1913, and later to Canada and the United States where he met Marcus Garvey and W. E. B. Du Bois.

While he grew up speaking the Tswana language, Plaatje would become a polyglot. Fluent in at least seven languages, he worked as a court interpreter during the Siege of Mafeking, and translated works of William Shakespeare into Tswana. His talent for language would lead to a career in journalism and writing. He was editor and part-owner of Kuranta ya Becoana (Bechuana Gazette) in Mahikeng, and in Kimberley Tsala ya Becoana (Bechuana Friend) and Tsala ya Batho (The Friend of the People).

Plaatje was the first black South African to write a novel in English – Mhudi. He wrote the novel in 1919, but it was only published in 1930 (in 1928 the Zulu writer R. R. R. Dhlomo published an English-language novel, entitled An African Tragedy, at the missionary Lovedale Press, in Alice; this makes Dhlomo's novel the first published black South African novel in English, even though Plaatje's Mhudi had been written first). He also wrote Native Life in South Africa, which Neil Parsons describes as "one of the most remarkable books on Africa by one of the continent's most remarkable writers", and Boer War Diary that was first published 40 years after his death.

Performing 

Plaatje made three visits to Britain. There he met many people of similar views. One was the cinema and theatrical impresario George Lattimore who in 1923 was promoting with Pathé, Cradle of the World, the "most marvellous and thrilling travel film ever screened". In a letter to the pan-Africanist W. E. B. Du Bois, Lattimore reported that he was having a "successful run"  at the Philharmonic Hall in London. The show, which had the character of a revue, included live music and singing. Plaatje was recruited by Lattimore to take the role of an African tribesman.

His recording of "Nkosi Sikelel' iAfrika" with Sylvia Colenso at the piano is believed to be the earliest extant recording of what would become the national anthem of South Africa.

Personal life 

Plaatje was a committed Christian, and organised a fellowship group called the Christian Brotherhood at Kimberley. He was married to Elizabeth Lilith M'belle, a union that would produce six children – Frederick York St Leger, Halley, Richard, Violet, Olive and Johannes Gutenberg. He died of pneumonia at Pimville, Johannesburg on 19 June 1932 aged 55, and was buried in Kimberley. Over a thousand people attended the funeral.

Recognition and legacy 

 1935: three years after his death, a tombstone was erected over Plaatje's grave with the inscription: "I Khutse Morolong: Modiredi Wa Afrika – Rest in Peace Morolong, You Servant of Africa".

Decades passed before Plaatje began to receive the recognition he deserved. "Much of what he strove for came to nought," writes his biographer Brian Willan; "his political career was gradually forgotten, his manuscripts were lost or destroyed, his published books largely unread. His novel Mhudi formed part of no literary tradition, and was long regarded as little more than a curiosity."

 1970s: interest was stirred in Plaatje's journalistic and literary legacy through the work of John Comaroff (who edited for publication The Boer War Diary of Sol T. Plaatje, and by Tim Couzens and Stephen Gray (who focused attention on Sol Plaatje's novel, Mhudi)
 1978: Mhudi was re-published under the editorial guidance of Stephen Gray
 1982: Plaatje's Native Life in South Africa: Before and Since the European War and the Boer Rebellion (1916) was re-published by Ravan Press.
 1982: the African Writers Association instituted a Sol Plaatje Prose Award (alongside the H. I. E. and R. R. R. Dhlomo Drama Award and the S. E. K. Mqhayi Poetry Award).
 1984: Brian Willan published his biography, Sol Plaatje: South African Nationalist, 1876–1932.
 1991: The Sol Plaatje Educational Trust and Museum, housed in Plaatje's Kimberley home at 32 Angel Street, was opened, actively furthering his written legacy.
 1992: the house at 32 Angel Street in Kimberley, where Plaatje spent his last years, was declared a national monument (now a provincial heritage site). It continues as the Sol Plaatje Museum and Library, run by the Sol Plaatje Educational Trust, with donor funding. In the 2000s the Sol Plaatje Educational Trust has published Plaatje biographies by Maureen Rall and Sabata-Mpho Mokae.
 circa 1995: the Sol Plaatje Municipality (Kimberley) in South Africa's Northern Cape Province was named in Plaatje's honour.
 1996: Sol Plaatje: Selected writings, ed. Brian Willan, is published by the University of Witwatersrand Press.
 1998: an honorary doctorate was posthumously conferred on Plaatje by the University of the North-West, with several of his descendants present.
 1998: Plaatje's grave in West End Cemetery, Kimberley, was declared a national monument (now a provincial heritage site). It was only the second grave in South African history to be awarded national monument status.
 2000: The Diamond Fields Advertiser launches the Sol T Plaatje Memorial Award to honour the top Setswana and top English matriculant each year in the Northern Cape. The first recipients are Claire Reddie (English) and Neo Molefi (Setswana).
 2000: the Department of Education building in Pretoria was renamed Sol Plaatje House, on 15 June 2000, "in honour of this political giant and consummate educator."
 2000: the South African Post Office issued a series of stamps featuring writers of the Boer War, with Plaatje appearing on the 1.30 Rand stamp. The series also includes Sir Arthur Conan Doyle, Winston Churchill, Johanna Brandt and the Anglo-Boer War Medal.
 2000: the African National Congress initiated the Sol Plaatje Award, one of a number of annual achievement awards. The Sol Plaatje Award recognises the best performing ANC branch.
 2002: the Sol Plaatje Media Leadership Institute was established within Rhodes University's Department of Journalism and Media Studies.
 2005: the Saulspoort Dam was renamed Sol Plaatje Dam, although not in honour of Sol Plaatje the man but in remembrance of 41 Sol Plaatje Municipal workers drowned in a bus disaster there on 1 May 2003.
 2007: the Sol Plaatje Prize for Translation was instituted by the English Academy of South Africa, awarded bi-annually for translation of prose or poetry into English from any of the other South African official languages.
 2009: the Sol Plaatje Power Station at the Sol Plaatje Dam was commissioned – the first commercial small hydro power station constructed in South Africa in 22 years.
 2009: Sol Plaatje was honoured in the Posthumous Literary Award given by the South African Literary Awards.
 2010: the first Plaatje Festival, held in Mahikeng, hosted by the North West Province Departments of Sport, Arts and Culture and of Education, on 5 and 6 November 2010. It brought together Plaatje and Molema descendants, poets, journalists, scholars, language practitioners, educators, and learners, who "paid tribute to this brilliant Setswana man of letters."
 2010: a statue of Sol Plaatje, seated and writing at a desk, was unveiled in Kimberley by South African President Jacob Zuma on 9 January 2010, the 98th anniversary of the founding of the African National Congress. By sculptor Johan Moolman, it was erected at Kimberley's Civic Centre, formerly the Malay Camp, and situated approximately where Plaatje had his printing press in 1910 – 13.
 2011: the European Union Sol Plaatje Poetry Competition was inaugurated, honouring "the spirit of the legendary intellectual giant, Sol Plaatje, the activist, linguist and translator, novelist, journalist and leader." Winners' work has been published in an annual anthology since the competition's inauguration.
 2012: Seetsele Modiri Molema's Lover of his people: a biography of Sol Plaatje was published. Translated and edited by D. S. Matjila and Karen Haire, the manuscript, Sol T. Plaatje: Morata Wabo, dating from the 1960s, was the first Plaatje biography written in his mother tongue, Setswana, and the only book-length biography written by someone who actually knew Plaatje.
 2013: the naming of the Sol Plaatje University in Kimberley, which opened in 2014, was announced by President Jacob Zuma on 25 July 2013.
 2013: the renaming of UNISA's Florida Campus Library as the Sol Plaatje Library, unveiled on 30 July 2013.
 Schools in Kimberley and Mahikeng are named after Sol Plaatje.
 2016: Sol Plaatje's Native Life in South Africa: Past and Present by Brian Willan, Janet Remmington and Bhekizizwe Peterson is published by Wits University Press and goes on to win 'Best Non-Fiction Edited Volume' in the 2018 NIHSS Awards.
 2018: Sol Plaatje: A life of Solomon Tshekisho Plaatje 1876 – 1932 by Brian Willan is published by Jacana Media and goes on to win 'Best Non-Fiction Biography' in the 2020 NIHSS Awards.
 2020: Sol Plaatje’s Mhudi: History, Criticism, Celebration, a collection of essays edited by Sabata-Mpho Mokae and Brian Willan is published by Jacana Media.

Original writing 

  with John L. Comaroff
 The Essential Interpreter (circa 1909): an essay
 
 
 
 
 Bantu Folk-Tales and Poems
  ed. Brian Willan

Translations of Shakespeare 

 Dikhontsho tsa bo-Juliuse Kesara – Julius Caesar
 Diphosho-phosho – The Comedy of Errors

Both of these were called "remarkably good" translations in a 1949 study.

References

Other relevant literature

 
 
Couzens, Tim. 1987. "Sol T. Plaatje and the First South African Epic". English in Africa 14: 41–65.
 
 
 
 Matjila, D. S. and K. Haire. 2004. Echoes of and affinities with Bogosi (kingship) in the works of Sol T. Plaatje. South African Journal of African Languages, Volume 34, 2014, Issue 1

Further reading 

 
 
 
 
 
 
  (US edition published 2019.)

External links 
 
 
  at the Anglo-Boer War Museum/War Museum of the Boer Republics.
 
 
 Audio Recordings: 
 
  Audio from South African Music Archive Project.
 Archive papers comprising biographical material, papers, notes, correspondence and photographs of Solomon Tshekisho Plaatje:
 
  Digitised material from the collection.

1876 births
1932 deaths
People from Tokologo Local Municipality
South African Tswana people
South African Christians
African National Congress politicians
South African journalists
South African newspaper editors
Deaths from pneumonia in South Africa
Proverb scholars
Tswana-language writers
Translators of William Shakespeare
Members of the Order of Luthuli